J. W. Mitchell High School (also called Mitchell or JWMHS), is a public high school in New Port Richey, Florida, located next to Seven Springs Middle School. Its current principal is Jessica Schultz. It is one of the largest schools in the Pasco County Schools district. The school opened on August 14, 2000.

History
J. W. Mitchell High School opened at the start of the 2000–01 school year, designed to relieve overcrowding at River Ridge and Gulf High Schools. Its first graduating class was in 2002. The school is named for James Mitchell, a rancher, community leader and businessman. His wife Dorothy served on the school board for about 20 years.

The school gained nationwide publicity in 2019 when its science lab classes were the first in the US to use synthetic frogs for dissection, instead of preserved real frogs. The move eliminates student exposure to formaldehyde and overcomes ethical objections raised in recent years to the widespread killing and dissection of the amphibians.

State championships
The Mustangs were the state boys soccer champions for the 2009–10 school year.  Mitchell's hockey team was also the state champion for the 2011–12 school year.

Notable alumni

Tyler Clippard – professional baseball player
Ryan Garton – professional baseball player
Patrick Schuster – professional baseball player
•Nathan Smith- professional NHL player for the Arizona Coyotes https://en.m.wikipedia.org/wiki/Nathan_Smith_(ice_hockey,_born_1998)

References

External links

J. W. Mitchell High School website

Educational institutions established in 2000
High schools in Pasco County, Florida
Public high schools in Florida
New Port Richey, Florida
2000 establishments in Florida